Maraqopa is the tenth studio album by American rock musician Damien Jurado, produced by Richard Swift. It was released on February 21, 2012, on Secretly Canadian.

The story follows a man who disappears from society. He takes nothing with him except a couple hundred dollars and stumbles upon a mysterious place called Maraqopa. "He's discovering a lot of interesting things about who he is," Jurado explains. "He ends up leaving Maraqopa after a while, and then he gets into a car accident."

Track listing

References

2012 albums
Damien Jurado albums
Albums produced by Richard Swift (singer-songwriter)
Secretly Canadian albums